The Port of Roxas, Oriental Mindoro or Dangay Port is the seaport in Roxas, Oriental Mindoro in the Philippines.

The seaport serves as a gateway to Mindanao and Visayas from Luzon with passengers being transported from the Dangay port to Caticlan. The primary products being handled at the port are rice, rice bran, fruits, vegetables, fish and home appliances.

References

Roxas, Oriential Mindoro Port
Buildings and structures in Oriental Mindoro
Transportation in Mindanao